Ballistet (Albanian: Ballistët) are ultra supporters of the KF Shkëndija football club in Tetovo, North Macedonia. They were officially established as the main ultras group for Shkëndija in 1992.

History
The supporters of KF Shkëndija are called the Ballistët, named after the nationalistic movement  World War II Balli Kombëtar. When the club was formed in 1979, use of nationalism was strictly prohibited by the Yugoslavian government. The supporting firm of Shkëndija called themselves BAL, using the first three letters of Balli Kombëtar. When Shkëndija was reinstated into the Macedonian Football League, the supporting firm was re-established as the Ballistët in 1992. When kick-off commences, The Ballistët always sing the national anthem of Albania. Group is also known for their extreme nationalistic, time to time separatiatic rhetoric, expressing pride for their Albanian heritage and also intolerance for other ethnic groups in North Macedonia. In Tetovo, the group has been responsible for the desecration of the monument to the fallen partisans in the national-liberation struggle. They graffiti "Ballistet Shkëndija" and "1992 Ultras". This occurred ten days after the Macedonian independence day.

2010s
The Ballistët are one of the most notorious football supporter groups in North Macedonia. Their antics are occasionally reported on the news. On 18 October 2010, Shkëndija played against FK Napredok away in Kicevo. The Ballist removed the Macedonian flag from the mast and put an Albanian flag in its place. As the police tried to put the Macedonian flag up again, the Ballist tore out their seats and threw them at the police.

Fans of opposing clubs barely go to Ecolog Arena as the "Ballistet" are one of the largest firms in North Macedonia. This was noted when FK Rabotnički played Shkëndija in 2008. Rabotnicki had the lead over Shkëndija in Tetovo with the score 0:1. A loss would have meant relegation into the second division. At half time, Rabotnicki's players and coaches were attacked when they were leaving the pitch. Rabotnicki supporters and police could not stop the large presence of Shkëndija supporters, resulting in the match to be abandoned and Shkëndija being relegated to the second league.

On 3 August 2010, during a heated match with city rivals Teteks, the majority of the supporters of Teteks, the Vojvodi, abandoned their team in the 78th minute and left the stadium to avoid clashing with the Shkëndija supporters after the game. Those that remained for the whole game had to remain in the stadium as the Ballistët were outside the stadium waiting for them. A heavy police presence escorted the Teteks supporters out of the stadium.

On 11 September 2011, the Shkendija supporters attacked fans and players of FK Ohrid at half time. This resulted in Shkendija supporters being suspended for two home matches.

After Partizan Belgrade defeated Shkëndija in Skopje for the qualifying rounds of the 2011–12 UEFA Champions League, Partizan coach Aleksandar Stanojevic stated that Shkëndija out played Partizan in the first half due to the great atmosphere of the Shkëndija supporters intimidating the Partizan players. In the match, the Albanian flag covered the entire west end of the stadium, along with banners such as "Ballistet", "1st state Albania, 2nd state Kosova, 3rd state coming soon" and "24 March 1999". The Ballistet chanted notable remarks such as, "Ubi ubi srbina" (Kill the Serbs)
, Adem Jashari, UÇK, Republic of Kosovo and singing Albanian nationalist songs.

On 10 March 2012, two Shkëndija supporters were arrested after a policeman was stabbed while apparently protecting two men from a mob attack. The cause of this was retaliation for the killing of two ethnic Albanians by an off-duty police officer in the town of Gostivar. After the arrests, hardcore Shkendija fans, the Ballistët, threatened to cause trouble in a match against league leaders Vardar Skopje originally scheduled for Wednesday, which had been suspended and played on another date with no fans being allowed to attend.

In May 2012, a delegation of the Ballistët ultras travelled to neighbouring Kosovo to pay their respects at a shrine to Adem Jashari, one of the founders of the Kosovo Liberation Army.
On 4 May 2012, the Ballistët joined counter-protests in ethnic Albanian neighbourhoods for the
inter-ethnic violence.

On 23 May 2013, the Macedonian Cup final was abandoned late on Wednesday between Shkëndija and Teteks. The match was abandoned after 20 minutes for fear that the chants might ignite violence. The Shkëndija supporters booed the Macedonian national anthem, threw flares at the police and security as well as chanting "Ballisti Zakon", "UÇK" and other nationalistic rhetoric. Also and Macedonian fans of Teteks did the same against Albanians. The match between Teteks and Shkëndija was rescheduled for Sunday and the Macedonian Football Federation said it would be played in an empty stadium to avoid provocation.

After Shkëndija's 5–0 victory over Teteks, Shkëlzen Meta, the leading captain of the Ballistët, handed over the reins to the young Isak Luma.

On 19 October 2014, during the rivalry match against FK Vardar, The Ballistët held a large banner stating "They are cancer of Europe  – UEFA do you need more?!" accompanied with a montage of pictures showing Serb hooligans involved in the Serbia vs England U-21 match, Italy vs Serbia match and the Serbia vs Albania match. The Ballistët are part of the TKZ ultras group that supports Albania in international football. In the next home game against FK Metalurg, the Ballistët, dissatisfied with the UEFA ruling of the cancelled Serbia vs Albania match, held banners stating "Dear Platinovic, They beat our players and won 3:0! We kill them in the return match and we get EURO 16 final spot??" along with chants against UEFA and Michel Platini.

On 7 April 2015, Shkëndija were fined by the FFM and supporters banned due to politically motivated banners and chants, as well as the assault on FK Tetek's manager Gorazd Mihajlov. A banner with a picture of Milenko Nedelkovski and an Orangutan were held up with a caption stating, "is there a difference?". The Ballistët have sent a letter to the FFM stating that the banner was in retaliation for Nedelkovski's offensive remarks about Albanians. Milenko Nedelkovski runs a talk show on Macedonia state television and is a fervent supporter of VMRO-DPMNE.

On the morning of the 21 February 2016, two buses of Buducnost Podgorica supporters, Varvari Podgorica, travelled to Skopje to attend a match. On the road to Skopje, Shkendija supporters, Ballistët, came across the supporters while heading towards the match between Shkendija and Turnovo on the bridge.  The slavic medias claim that Ballistët initiated the clash between the 2 groups, but in reality it was the Buducnost supporters attacking one bus of the Shkëndijas supporters convoy(around 10 buses in total). The other buses were a little left behind, when they arrived the clash had already started. When the Ballistët almost outnumbered the montenegrins and after the montenegrins getting beaten up, they started boarding their buses. The built adrenaline and the need of a hospital made the montenegrin drivers rage and speed up on the mountainy roads, nearly running over the opposite fans. After the clash Shkëndija's convoy continued the road without any consequences. Shkëndija won the match that day, with Marjan Radeski's only 2 goals of the match.

Notable fans
Shkëndija's main supporters are Albanians from Tetovo and Albanian diaspora. Some notable fans include politicians Shpend Ahmeti and Albin Kurti, actors Xhevdet Jashari and Blerim Destani, singers Shkumbin Ismaili and Arif Ziberi of Elita 5 and athletes, Blerim Dzemaili, Platon Etemi, Erjon Havziu,Lon Demiri and Admir Mehmedi.

References

KF Shkëndija
Ultras groups
Albania national football teams